Federico Bonini (born 6 August 2001) is an Italian footballer who plays as a defender for  club Gubbio on loan from Virtus Entella.

Club career

He has been regularly included on the match day squad of Virtus Entella in the 2018–19 season, but did not appear on the field.

He made his Serie B debut for Virtus Entella on 5 October 2019 in a game against Crotone. He substituted Fabrizio Poli in the 71st minute.

On 20 January 2020 he was loaned to Bologna where he made his Serie A debut on 29 July 2020, in a 0–4 loss against Fiorentina. He substituted Danilo Larangeira in the 84th minute.

He returned to Virtus Entella for the 2020–21 Serie B season and made 7 appearances that season, 5 of them as a starter, as Entella was relegated to Serie C.

On 31 August 2021, he was loaned to Gubbio in Serie C. On 23 July 2022, the loan to Gubbio was renewed for the 2022–23 season.

International
He was first called up to represent his country in September 2019 for Under-19 squad friendlies.

On 15 November 2021, he made his debut for the Under-20 squad in the 2021–22 Under 20 Elite League game against Romania and assisted on one of the goals in 7–0 victory.

References

External links
 

2001 births
Living people
People from Massa
Sportspeople from the Province of Massa-Carrara
Italian footballers
Association football defenders
Serie A players
Serie B players
Serie C players
Virtus Entella players
Bologna F.C. 1909 players
A.S. Gubbio 1910 players
Italy youth international footballers
Footballers from Tuscany